The 2022 Harvard Crimson football team represented Harvard University as a member of the Ivy League during the 2022 NCAA Division I FCS football season. The team was led by 28th-year head coach Tim Murphy and played its home games at Harvard Stadium.

Previous season

The Crimson finished the 2021 season with a record of 8–2, 5–2 Ivy League play to finish in third place.

Schedule

Game summaries

Merrimack

at Brown

No. 10 Holy Cross

at Cornell

at Howard

Princeton

at Dartmouth

Columbia

at Penn

Yale

References

Harvard
Harvard Crimson football seasons
Harvard Crimson football
Harvard Crimson football